This is a list of American Civil War units, consisting of those established as federally organized units as well as units raised by individual states and territories. Many states had soldiers and units fighting for both the United States (Union Army) and the Confederate States (Confederate States Army). The border states had both Confederate and Union units, and in many of the Confederate states Union forces organized Union units from individuals who swore loyalty to the United States.

United States

Federal organized
United States Colored Troops
United States Regular Army
United States Volunteers
District of Columbia

State forces
Alabama
Arkansas
California
Connecticut
Delaware
Florida
Georgia
Illinois
Indiana
Iowa
Kansas
Kentucky
Louisiana
Maine
Maryland
Massachusetts
Michigan
Minnesota
Mississippi
Missouri
Nevada
New Hampshire
New Jersey
New York
North Carolina
Ohio
Oregon
Pennsylvania
Rhode Island
South Carolina
Tennessee
Texas
Vermont
Virginia
West Virginia
Wisconsin

Territories
Colorado Territory
Dakota Territory
Indian Territory (Confederacy)
Nebraska Territory
New Mexico Territory
Washington Territory

Confederate States

Confederate organized
Confederate States Army units

State forces
Alabama
Arkansas
California
Florida
Georgia
Kentucky
Louisiana
Maryland
Mississippi
Missouri
North Carolina
South Carolina
Tennessee
Texas
Virginia
West Virginia

Territories
Arizona Territory
Indian Territory (also known as Oklahoma)